In mathematics and classical mechanics, the Poisson bracket is an important binary operation in Hamiltonian mechanics, playing a central role in Hamilton's equations of motion, which govern the time evolution of a Hamiltonian dynamical system. The Poisson bracket also distinguishes a certain class of coordinate transformations, called canonical transformations, which map canonical coordinate systems into canonical coordinate systems. The set of possible canonical transformations is always very rich. For instance, it is often possible to choose the Hamiltonian itself  as one of the new canonical momentum coordinates.

In a more general sense, the Poisson bracket is used to define a Poisson algebra, of which the algebra of functions on a Poisson manifold is a special case. There are other general examples, as well: it occurs in the theory of Lie algebras, where the tensor algebra of a Lie algebra forms a Poisson algebra; a detailed construction of how this comes about is given in the universal enveloping algebra article. Quantum deformations of the universal enveloping algebra lead to the notion of quantum groups.

All of these objects are named in honor of Siméon Denis Poisson.

Properties
Given two functions  and  that depend on phase space and time, their Poisson bracket  is another function that depends on phase space and time. The following rules hold for any three functions  of phase space and time:
Anticommutativity 
Bilinearity 
Leibniz's rule 
Jacobi identity 

Also, if a function  is constant over phase space (but may depend on time), then  for any .

Definition in canonical coordinates

The Poisson brackets of the canonical coordinates are

where  is the Kronecker delta.

Hamilton's equations of motion
Hamilton's equations of motion have an equivalent expression in terms of the Poisson bracket. This may be most directly demonstrated in an explicit coordinate frame. Suppose that  is a function on the solution's trajectory-manifold. Then from the multivariable chain rule,

Then 

Thus, the time evolution of a function  on a symplectic manifold can be given as a one-parameter family of symplectomorphisms (i.e., canonical transformations, area-preserving diffeomorphisms), with the time  being the parameter:  Hamiltonian motion is a canonical transformation generated by the Hamiltonian. That is, Poisson brackets are preserved in it, so that any time  in the solution to Hamilton's equations,

can serve as the bracket coordinates. Poisson brackets are canonical invariants.

Dropping the coordinates, 

The operator in the convective part of the derivative, is sometimes referred to as the Liouvillian (see Liouville's theorem (Hamiltonian)).

Constants of motion
An integrable dynamical system will have constants of motion in addition to the energy. Such constants of motion will commute with the Hamiltonian under the Poisson bracket. Suppose some function  is a constant of motion. This implies that if  is a trajectory or solution to Hamilton's equations of motion, then

along that trajectory. Then

where, as above, the intermediate step follows by applying the equations of motion and we assume that  does not explicitly depend on time. This equation is known as the Liouville equation. The content of Liouville's theorem  is that the time evolution of a measure given by a distribution function  is given by the above equation.

In order for a Hamiltonian system to be completely integrable,  independent constants of motion must be in mutual involution, where  is the number of degrees of freedom.

The Poisson bracket in coordinate-free language
Let  be a symplectic manifold, that is, a manifold equipped with a symplectic form: a 2-form  which is both closed (i.e., its exterior derivative  vanishes) and non-degenerate.  For example, in the treatment above, take  to be  and take

Alternatively, . It is easy to see that

The Poisson bracket is antisymmetric because:

Furthermore,

Here  denotes the vector field  applied to the function  as a directional derivative, and  denotes the (entirely equivalent) Lie derivative of the function .

The  will be symplectomorphisms (canonical transformations) for every  as a function of  if and only if ; when this is true,  is called a symplectic vector field. Therefore,  is a symplectic vector field if and only if α is a closed form. Since , it follows that every Hamiltonian vector field  is a symplectic vector field, and that the Hamiltonian flow consists of canonical transformations.

This is a fundamental result in Hamiltonian mechanics, governing the time evolution of functions defined on phase space. As noted above, when ,  is a constant of motion of the system.

It also follows from  that the Poisson bracket is a derivation; that is, it satisfies a non-commutative version of Leibniz's product rule:

The Poisson bracket is intimately connected to the Lie bracket of the Hamiltonian vector fields.  Because the Lie derivative is a derivation,

It follows that , so that

Thus, the Poisson bracket on functions corresponds to the Lie bracket of the associated Hamiltonian vector fields. We have also shown that the Lie bracket of two symplectic vector fields is a Hamiltonian vector field and hence is also symplectic.

It is widely asserted that the Jacobi identity for the Poisson bracket,

follows from the corresponding identity for the Lie bracket of vector fields, but this is true only up to a locally constant function.  However, to prove the Jacobi identity for the Poisson bracket, it is sufficient to show that:

By , the operator  is equal to the operator . The proof of the Jacobi identity follows from  because, up to the factor of -1, the Lie bracket of vector fields is just their commutator as differential operators.

The algebra of smooth functions on M, together with the Poisson bracket forms a Poisson algebra, because it is a Lie algebra under the Poisson bracket, which additionally satisfies Leibniz's rule .  We have shown that every symplectic manifold is a Poisson manifold, that is a manifold with a "curly-bracket" operator on smooth functions such that the smooth functions form a Poisson algebra.  However, not every Poisson manifold arises in this way, because Poisson manifolds allow for degeneracy which cannot arise in the symplectic case.

A result on conjugate momenta
Given a smooth vector field  on the configuration space, let  be its conjugate momentum. The conjugate momentum mapping is a Lie algebra anti-homomorphism from the Lie bracket to the Poisson bracket:

This important result is worth a short proof. Write a vector field  at point  in the configuration space as

where  is the local coordinate frame. The conjugate momentum to  has the expression

One then has, for a point  in the phase space,

The above holds for all , giving the desired result.

Quantization
Poisson brackets deform to Moyal brackets upon quantization, that is, they generalize to a different Lie algebra, the Moyal algebra, or, equivalently in Hilbert space, quantum commutators. The Wigner-İnönü group contraction of these (the classical limit)  yields the above Lie algebra.

To state this more explicitly and precisely, the universal enveloping algebra of the Heisenberg algebra is the Weyl algebra (modulo the relation that the center be the unit). The Moyal product is then a special case of the star product on the algebra of symbols. An explicit definition of the algebra of symbols, and the star product is given in the article on the universal enveloping algebra.

See also

Commutator
Dirac bracket
Lagrange bracket
Moyal bracket
Peierls bracket
Phase space
Poisson algebra
Poisson ring
Poisson superalgebra
Poisson superbracket

Remarks

References

External links
 
 

Symplectic geometry
Hamiltonian mechanics
Bilinear maps
Concepts in physics